The writhed hornbill (Rhabdotorrhinus leucocephalus), also known as the Mindanao wrinkled hornbill, is a species of hornbill in the family Bucerotidae.
It is endemic to humid forests on the Philippine islands of Mindanao, Dinagat and Camiguin Sur. It formerly included the Walden's hornbill as a subspecies, but unlike that species, both sexes of the writhed hornbill have orange-red throat and peri-ocular skin.

The writhed hornbill is threatened by habitat loss and hunting.

References

BirdLife Species Factsheet.

writhed hornbill
Endemic birds of the Philippines
Birds of Mindanao
Fauna of Dinagat Islands
Fauna of Camiguin
writhed hornbill
Taxa named by Louis Jean Pierre Vieillot
Taxonomy articles created by Polbot